Janne Mäkelä (born 23 July 1971) is a Finnish former footballer.

Mäkelä played 12 seasons in the Finnish premier division Veikkausliiga. 1996–1997 he played 8 matches for Raith Rovers in the Scottish Football League. Mäkelä capped 20 times for the Finland national team.

References 

1971 births
Footballers from Tampere
Finnish footballers
Finland international footballers
Veikkausliiga players
FC Ilves players
Myllykosken Pallo −47 players
FinnPa players
FC Jazz players
FC Haka players
FC Lahti players
Finnish expatriate footballers
Expatriate footballers in Scotland
Scottish Football League players
St Mirren F.C. players
Raith Rovers F.C. players
Living people
Association football defenders